Deborah Rush (born April 10, 1954) is an American actress. She has worked in television, film and on Broadway. In 1984, she was nominated for a Tony Award for Best Performance by a Featured Actress in a Play for Michael Frayn's comedy Noises Off. She also acted in Stephen Adly Guirgis' The Last Days of Judas Iscariot. In 2003 she acted in the comedy film American Wedding, as Mary Flaherty, Michelle Flaherty's mom. In December 2008, she joined the cast of the Broadway revival of Blithe Spirit.

Rush has acted in a number of movies and television series, including the Woody Allen films Zelig and The Purple Rose of Cairo. She was a regular cast member of the television series Strangers with Candy.  She had a recurring role on Spin City as Helen Winston, eventual ex-wife of mayor Randall Winston, and on Orange Is the New Black, as Piper's mother.

Family
She is the wife of Walter Cronkite III (born April 22, 1957) and daughter-in-law of the late television journalist Walter Cronkite. The couple has two sons, Walter Cronkite IV and the late Peter Cronkite.

Filmography

Film

Television

Theater

References

External links

Deborah Rush at Broadway.com

American film actresses
Actresses from New Jersey
People from Chatham Borough, New Jersey
1954 births
Living people
20th-century American actresses
21st-century American actresses
American television actresses
American stage actresses